The men's javelin throw event at the 2020 Summer Olympics took place on 4 and 7 August 2021 at the Japan National Stadium. Approximately 35 athletes competed; the exact number depended on how many nations use universality places to enter athletes in addition to the 32 qualifying through distance or ranking (one universality place was used in 2016).

Summary
Defending champion Thomas Röhler's results fell off back in 2019. He was not back to defend his title out of a strong German team. Silver medalist Julius Yego and bronze medalist Keshorn Walcott were back. 2019 World Champion Anderson Peters was also here, but the top thrower since the last Olympics was 2017 World Champion Johannes Vetter, who had the seven best throws of the year and an outlandish 97.76m in the COVID shortened 2020 season, which placed him #2 in history. Two of his early season 2021 throws could also claim the same position had he not thrown 97.76. The next best thrower of the season was Marcin Krukowski. 2017 silver medalist Jakub Vadlejch was in the mix of challengers behind Vetter.

Three got automatic qualifiers in their first attempts. Neeraj Chopra, Lassi Etelätalo and Julian Weber. Vetter and Vadlejch took three attempts just to make a qualifier. Yego, Walcott, Peters and Krukowski did not make the final.

On the first throw of the final of the competition, Chopra launched 87.03 to take the early lead. Weber threw 85.30 to move into second place. Vadlejch threw 83.98 to sit in third place. No other thrower came close to 82m in the second round. The third round had to settle who got three more throws. At the beginning of the round, Veselý was the #8 qualifier at 80.30m. Andrian Mardare improved his position with 82.84m then Veselý threw 85.44m to take over second place and pushing everyone else down. Lassi Etelätalo moved up with 83.28m. Vetter came up in 7th place off of his first round 82.58m and remained there after he threw barely over 75m and deliberately fouled. 8th place Arshad Nadeem came up and improved his mark to 84.62m, he had earlier made history by becoming the first ever Pakistani athlete to qualify for a track and field final at the Olympics. And the last thrower in the round, Aliaksei Katkavets landed his 83.71m away. The overwhelming number one thrower in the world was gone, he would get no more throws to challenge Chopra or the others. Nobody was able to improve in the fourth round. In the fifth round, Vadlejch leapfrogged from fifth to the silver medal with a 86.67m. The sixth round ended in a whimper as each of the contenders tried to get their best throw to challenge Chopra only to foul or have a below average result.

Chopra's gold medal was the first track medal for the nation of India and the first in over a century for an athlete from that geographical region.

Background

This was the 26th appearance of the event, having appeared in every Summer Olympics since 1908.

Qualification

A National Olympic Committee (NOC) could enter up to 3 qualified athletes in the men's javelin throw event if all athletes meet the entry standard or qualify by ranking during the qualifying period. (The limit of 3 has been in place since the 1930 Olympic Congress.) The qualifying standard is 85.00 metres. This standard was "set for the sole purpose of qualifying athletes with exceptional performances unable to qualify through the IAAF World Rankings pathway." The world rankings, based on the average of the best five results for the athlete over the qualifying period and weighted by the importance of the meet, will then be used to qualify athletes until the cap of 32 is reached.

The qualifying period was originally from 1 May 2019 to 29 June 2020. Due to the COVID-19 pandemic, the period was suspended from 6 April 2020 to 30 November 2020, with the end date extended to 29 June 2021. The world rankings period start date was also changed from 1 May 2019 to 30 June 2020; athletes who had met the qualifying standard during that time were still qualified, but those using world rankings would not be able to count performances during that time. The qualifying time standards could be obtained in various meets during the given period that have the approval of the IAAF. Both outdoor and indoor meets are eligible. The most recent Area Championships may be counted in the ranking, even if not during the qualifying period.

NOCs can also use their universality place—each NOC can enter one male athlete regardless of time if they had no male athletes meeting the entry standard for an athletics event—in the javelin throw.

Men's javelin throw 
Entry number: 32.

Competition format

The 2020 competition will continue to use the two-round format with divided final introduced in 1936. The qualifying round gives each competitor three throws to achieve a qualifying distance (83.50 metres; 2016 used 83.00 metres); if fewer than 12 men do so, the top 12 will advance. The final provides each thrower with three throws; the top eight throwers receive an additional three throws for a total of six, with the best to count (qualifying round throws are not considered for the final).

Records
Prior to this competition, the existing world, Olympic, and area records were as follows.

Schedule
All times are Japan Standard Time (UTC+9)

The men's javelin throw took place over two separate days.

Results

Qualifying
Qualification Rules: Qualifying performance 83.50 (Q) or at least 12 best performers (q) advance to the Final

Final

References

Men's javelin throw
2020
Men's events at the 2020 Summer Olympics